Municipal Real Mamoré is a Bolivian football club from Trinidad, founded in 2006 after the merge of Municipal Trinidad and Real Mamoré, the team won the 2nd division tournament in 2006 and won promotion to 1st division. In early 2007 the team changed its name to Real Mamoré.

Players

Achievements

National honours
First Division – Professional Era: 0
Second Division, Copa Simón Bolivar: 1
2006

External links

Football clubs in Bolivia
Association football clubs established in 2006
2006 establishments in Bolivia
Trinidad, Bolivia